is a Japanese politician of the Liberal Democratic Party (LDP). He has been a member of the House of Representatives in the national Diet since 1993 and currently represents the Chiba 10th district; he has previously represented the Southern Kanto proportional representation block and the pre-1996 Chiba 2nd district.

Career
A native of Katori District, Chiba, Hayashi graduated the Nihon University's College of Arts in 1970. Hayashi began his political career as a secretary to his late father, Taikan Hayashi, who served as chief of the former Environment Agency in the early 1990s.

Motoo Hayashi was elected to the assembly of Chiba Prefecture for the first time in 1983 and served for three times. He was elected to the House of Representatives for the first time in 1993. An expert on issues related to Narita International Airport, he was appointed Senior Vice-Minister of Land, Infrastructure and Transport (Koizumi Cabinet) in 2003. He has pledged to improve Japan's transport network.

On August 1, 2008 Prime Minister Yasuo Fukuda appointed him to the cabinet position of National Public Chairman, State Minister in Charge of Okinawa and Affairs Related to the Northern Territories.

Hayashi is currently serving in the Lower House representing Chiba's Tenth District and is a member of Shinzō Abe's cabinet with many responsibilities: Minister of Economy, Trade and Industry, Minister in charge of Industrial Competitiveness, Minister in charge of the Response to the Economic Impact caused by the Nuclear Accident, Minister of State for the Nuclear Damage Compensation and Decommissioning Facilitation Corporation.

Hayashi also served as Chairman of the Committee on Land, Infrastructure, Transport and Tourism of Diet, Minister of State, Chairman of National Public Safety Commission (Aso Cabinet), and Acting Chairman, Election Strategy Committee.

Ideology 
Hayashi is affiliated to the openly revisionist lobby Nippon Kaigi, and a member of the following right-wing Diet groups:
Nippon Kaigi Diet discussion group (日本会議国会議員懇談会 - Nippon kaigi kokkai giin kondankai)
Conference of parliamentarians on the Shinto Association of Spiritual Leadership (神道政治連盟国会議員懇談会 - Shinto Seiji Renmei Kokkai Giin Kondankai) - NB: SAS a.k.a. Sinseiren, Shinto Political League

Hayashi gave the following answers to the questionnaires submitted by Mainichi to parliamentarians:
in 2012:
in favor of the revision of the Constitution
in favor of the right of collective self-defense (revision of Article 9)
in favor of the reform of the National assembly (unicameral instead of bicameral)
in favor of reactivating nuclear power plants
against the goal of zero nuclear power by 2030s
in favor of the relocation of Marine Corps Air Station Futenma (Okinawa)
in favor of evaluating the purchase of Senkaku Islands by the Government
in favor of an effort to avoid conflict with China
against the participation of Japan to the Trans-Pacific Partnership
against a nuclear-armed Japan
against the reform of the Imperial Household that would allow women to retain their Imperial status even after marriage
in 2014:
in favor of the revision of the Article 9 of the Japanese Constitution
in favor of the right of collective self-defense
in favor of nuclear plants
no problem for visits of a Prime Minister to the controversial Yasukuni Shrine
no answer regarding the revision of the Murayama Statement
no answer regarding the revision of the Kono Statement
no answer regarding laws preventing hate speech
no answer regarding question whether Marine Corps Air Station Futenma is a burden for Okinawa
in favor of the Special Secrecy Law
in favor of teaching 'morality' in school

Notes

References

External links 
  in Japanese.

1947 births
Living people
Politicians from Chiba Prefecture
Nihon University alumni
Members of Nippon Kaigi
Members of the House of Representatives (Japan)
Government ministers of Japan
Liberal Democratic Party (Japan) politicians
21st-century Japanese politicians